The Camden Highline is a proposed elevated public park and greenway that will run from Camden Town to King's Cross, transforming a disused section of the North London Line and running alongside it. The project plans to be 0.75 miles (1.2km) long, running from Camden Gardens to York Way to act as an alternative walking route between Camden Town and Kings Cross.

Background history
This section of what is now the North London Line opened in 1850 by the East & West India Docks and Birmingham Junction Railway, with a new station at Camden Town opening at the same time on St Pancras Way. In 1853, this company became the North London Railway. The station on the line was renamed as Camden Road. On 1st July 1870 the name reverted to Camden Road, only to be resited in December of that year further west. The name was later changed again in 1950 to the present Camden Road. In 1984, the third platform to the station closed and the whole section from what is now the Camden Road West Junction to Camden Road East Junction was reduced from quadruple tracks to two tracks.

Proposal
The project was envisioned by a geographer, Oliver O'Brien, in 2015 and promoted by Camden Town Unlimited.

In 2017 a crowdfunding campaign raised £64k using the Spacehive platform and received 314 donations including the Mayor of London, Sadiq Khan who said: "This innovative project has the potential to become a real asset for Camden and is a great example of a local community taking an idea and garnering support in order to make it a reality. I look forward to seeing it develop."

The project started fundraising the construction costs in August 2019.

In 2020 an international competition was held to find a design team and 76 bids were received. Entrants included Adjaye Associates, AL_A, AHMM, Asif Khan, Coffey Architects, Cullinan Studio, CZWG, David Kohn, Grant Associates, Hawkins\Brown, Jamie Fobert Architects, LDA, Lifschutz Davidson Sandilands, Migrants Bureau, Weston Williamson, and Zaha Hadid Architects. International submissions were also lodged by BIG, Snøhetta. West 8, and Diller Scofidio + Renfro. The competition shortlist included the 2019 RIBA Stirling Prize contenders Feilden Fowles Architects; London-based Benedetti Architects; Southwark's We Made That with Hassell, Agence Ter of Paris; and US-based James Corner Field Operations, which led the team behind New York's High Line.

Planning approval and proposed route
In January 2023, the project was given planning approval for the first section between Camden Gardens and Royal College Street. It will have access to Camden Road railway station with lifts and stairs at each end. Various features are proposed to be included such as an edible garden, a grandstand, a play area and wildlife habitats, as well as an architectural screen for trainspotting. The project is expected to cost a further £14 million to build with it being estimated to open in 2025.

The other stages still yet to be approved are from Royal College Street to Camley Street, and Camley Street to York Way with various access points as the park crosses on the former railway bridges. One such entrance, at Royal College Street, will be through the former building of the first Camden Road station which is now a Grade II listed building.

References

External links
Camden Highline

 

Footpaths in London
Cycleways in London
Transport in the London Borough of Camden
Transport in the London Borough of Islington
Parks and open spaces in the London Borough of Camden
Parks and open spaces in the London Borough of Islington   
London Overground
H
Kings Cross, London
Rail trails in England
Greenways
Elevated parks
North London Railway
Grade II listed buildings in the London Borough of Camden
Linear parks